The Marais des Cygnes Massacre Site, also known as Marais des Cygnes Massacre Memorial Park, is a state historic site near Trading Post, Kansas that commemorates the 1858 massacre of the same name. On May 19, 1858, during a period of political instability and sporadic violence known as Bleeding Kansas, a group of pro-slavery border ruffians captured 11 abolitionist free-staters.  The prisoners were forced to a nearby ravine, where 10 of them were shot, resulting in five fatalities.  The abolitionist John Brown later built a fort near the site.  The first commemoration at the site was two stone markers erected by men of the 3rd Iowa Cavalry Regiment in 1864, although these monuments had been destroyed by souvenir hunters by 1895.  In 1941, the land where the massacre occurred, as well as an 1870s-era house constructed by a friend of Brown, were transferred to the state of Kansas.  The site was listed on the National Register of Historic Places in 1971 and designated a National Historic Landmark in 1974.  The Kansas Historical Society administers the site, which is interpreted by signage and a hand-cranked audio recording.

History

Background
When the United States Congress passed the Kansas–Nebraska Act in 1854, it did not directly state whether Kansas Territory and Nebraska Territory would allow slavery or not.  While Nebraska did not see much controversy, Kansas became a hotly debated area.  While the previous Missouri Compromise would have prevented slavery from being practiced in Kansas, the new law left the question open.  In response to the new opening, pro-slavery advocates known as border ruffians, many of whom were from Missouri, entered Kansas to illegally vote in an attempt to sway local elections.  The New England Emigrant Aid Company also sought to bring anti-slavery settlers into the territory.  The elections, which were held on March 30, 1855, resulted in a pro-slavery majority in the Kansas territorial government, who in turn created laws protecting slavery and, among other things, outlawing abolitionist literature.  Abolitionist sentiment was strong near Lawrence, and several prominent Lawrence residents formed the Free State Party to organize resistance to the pro-slavery government in September.  In October, free-staters drafted the Topeka Constitution, which sought to create an abolitionist government in the state.  There were now both pro- and anti-slavery governments vying for control of Kansas; President of the United States Franklin Pierce supported the pro-slavery government as the lawful one.

Beginning in 1855, the political disturbances transitioned into a period of sporadic violence known as Bleeding Kansas.  On May 21, 1856, the Sack of Lawrence was carried out by several hundred supporters of slavery.  While there were no fatalities, several buildings were burned down and newspaper equipment was destroyed.  Later that month, John Brown, an abolitionist, led a group that murdered five pro-slavery southerners in a single night, an event that became known as the Pottawatomie massacre.  In 1858, the situation deteriorated further.  James Montgomery led a group of free-staters who fought with elements of the United States Army garrison of Fort Scott in the Battle of Paint Creek in April; one of the soldiers was slain in the action.  The next month, Montgomery and some of his followers successfully evicted border ruffians from Linn County.

Massacre

On May 19, a border ruffian named Charles Hamilton led a group of about 30 men on a ride through the settlement of Trading Post.  After taking 11 local free-staters hostage, the border ruffians forced them into a nearby ravine and began shooting at them.  10 of the men were hit by the fire, five of them fatally.  The wife of one of the victims followed the border ruffians to the site, and attempted to give medical treatment to the wounded.  Later that day, other locals gathered at the area, aiding the wounded and disposing of the bodies of the dead.  Rumor spread that the massacre had been planned in a building known as the Western Hotel; Montgomery unsuccessfully attempted to burn it down on June 5.

Land south of the ravine where the massacre occurred was owned by a local blacksmith, who later sold the site to Charles Hadsall, a friend of Brown.  In late June, Brown built a two-story log fort south of the ravine; Hadsall allowed him to keep a military post at the site.  Brown abandoned the fort later that summer.

Description
Commemoration of the massacre began in late October 1864, when men of the 3rd Iowa Cavalry Regiment erected two stone markers at the site, after the Battle of Mine Creek during the American Civil War.  In 1889, on the anniversary of the battle, a formal monument to the victims was dedicated in a cemetery at Trading Post.  By 1895, souvenir hunters had largely destroyed the 1864 markers.  Hadsall, probably in the 1870s, built a stone house next to the fort site.  A spring was enclosed by the house, although the fort itself was destroyed by sightseers. In 1941, a Veterans of Foreign Wars post donated the site of the massacre and Hadsall's house to the state of Kansas.

From 19611962, the home underwent a renovation, after which it was transferred to Kansas Historical Society administration.  In 1964, part of the house was transitioned into use as a museum. The site was listed on the National Register of Historic Places on June 21, 1971, with a reference number of 71000317.  It was further listed as a National Historic Landmark (NHL) on May 30, 1974.  The area is still rural.  Signs provide interpretation of the events of the massacre, and a hand-cranked device plays an audio recording.  The NHL-designated area incorporates .  As of October 2020, the site is open from dusk to dawn.  No admission fee is charged, and visits are self-guided.  The Hadsall house still stands and can be viewed from the exterior.  Sites designed for picnicing are also present at the park.

See also
List of National Historic Landmarks in Kansas
National Register of Historic Places in Linn County, Kansas

References

Sources
 
 

Kansas state historic sites
National Historic Landmarks in Kansas
Protected areas of Linn County, Kansas
Conflict sites on the National Register of Historic Places in Kansas
National Register of Historic Places in Linn County, Kansas
American Civil War on the National Register of Historic Places
Bleeding Kansas